Times of Lore is a 1988 action role-playing game that was developed and published by Origin Systems for several platforms, including PC, Commodore 64/128, ZX Spectrum, Amstrad CPC, Atari ST, Apple II, NES, and Amiga.

Plot

The game's story tells of the kingdom of Albareth whose monarch High King Valwyn has disappeared and the dukes and barons are wrestling for power. Barbarians are threatening to invade, while monsters are pillaging the land. The player must assume the role of one of three heroes, choosing between a barbarian, a knight, and a valkyrie; and unravel the conspiracy and find three magic items.

Gameplay

The game takes place in a very complex world, featuring 13,000 screens of map according to the promotional material. There is no loading during the game, which was quite a feat at the time for such a massive environment.

The Commodore 64 version features high-res overlays for the sprites, a technique that employs two sprites on top of each other one being a low resolution multi-colour sprite the other a high resolution monochrome sprite. Animated water is also used and the game world slowly changes colour between night and day.

It is possible to get to un-winnable situations which require restarting the game, such as killing important characters who would otherwise have given you certain quests or objects. Killing random peasants is not as dangerous, as staying the night at the inn will make them forget your trespasses.

There are many objects to be found in the game, including a teleportation scroll, a returning axe à la Mjolnir, and healing potions. There is the hidden city of Treela, in the middle of the map, behind a forest. Serfs will speak of a dragon in the north, which can be found sleeping in his cave on the eastern edge of the northern mountains. Catacombs also exists but if entered, the ghouls inside are unleashed upon the world, making the game much more difficult. In the Apple II version, the dragon is replaced with a giant lurking in the northwest portion of the map.

Development
Times of Lore, developed by Chris Roberts, was originally titled Ultra Realm. According to Roberts, it was inspired by console action-adventures, particularly The Legend of Zelda. Roberts stated that "interfaces and design are being affected" by the video game console market and that what "the Japanese market originally demanded were certain constraints which did not affect the depth and quality of a game."

Reception
Scorpia of Computer Gaming World recommended Times of Lore as an introductory computer RPG, noting both dialogue and actions were menu-driven, simplifying the game. Compute! agreed with the recommendation, noting that the game's scale was smaller than the Ultima games' and praising its graphics and sound. The magazine named the game to its list of "nine great games for 1989" as "an excellent introductory-level fantasy role-playing game".

Legacy
Times of Lore went on to inspire several later titles by Origin Systems. This includes the 1990 title Bad Blood, another action RPG based on the same engine. It also inspired the 1990 title Ultima VI: The False Prophet, which adopted several elements from Times of Lore, including real-time elements, a constant-scale open world (replacing the unscaled overworld of earlier Ultima games), and an icon-based point & click interface. Richard Garriott, in addition to citing it as an influence on Ultima VI, said that Ultima VII: The Black Gate was also inspired by Times of Lore. The game was a precursor to Diablo and Baldur's Gate: Dark Alliance.

References

External links

Times of Lore at Hall of Light

1988 video games
Action role-playing video games
Amiga games
Amstrad CPC games
Apple II games
Atari ST games
Commodore 64 games
DOS games
Fantasy video games
Nintendo Entertainment System games
Origin Systems games
Single-player video games
Video games scored by Martin Galway
Video games developed in the United States
Video games featuring female protagonists
ZX Spectrum games